Yim Guechse (born November 20, 1946 in Phnom Penh) is a Cambodian poet and author, who lives in Germany.

Life and work

Guechse Yim went in 1971 to the GDR and studied at the Karl-Marx-Universität in Leipzig in linguistics. In 1976 he went to West-Berlin and studied library science at the FU Berlin until 1981.

Guechse Yim writes in Khmer. Only a few of his poems were translated into the German, French and Spanish languages. In his works, he treats the corporal love, as well as social problems in Cambodia with many references to the khmer-tradition. In 1970 he published the novel "Ramayana in the dramas", followed by a collection of poems "A decade of dreams". In 1986 his social-critical novel "Good by, rose of Phnom Penh" was published, along with two new collections of poems "Life against the stream" and "Creep among the life". 1988 also saw the publication of his novel "Kolab, the cambodiana", and in 1990 another novel "Shared life". Guechse Yim is engaged in the Studiengemeinschaft Kambodschanische Kultur e. V.. Between 1986 and 2003 he was co-editor of the magazine „Kambodschanische Kultur“, for which he wrote some articles.

See also

 Chuth Khay
 Hak Chhay Hok
 Keng Vannsak
 Khun Srun
 Kong Bunchhoeun
 Soth Polin
 Vandy Kaonn

External links 
 Page of Yim Guechse in Khmer
 
 poem: „Vietnamese diplomatic lies“ in Khmer
 Poem: „Monks brawl“ in Khmer
 Publications of Guechse Yim in the catalogue of the Staatsbibliothek zu Berlin

Cambodian male writers
Cambodian poets
1946 births
People from Phnom Penh
Living people
Male poets
Cambodian novelists
Male novelists
20th-century poets
20th-century novelists
20th-century German male writers
20th-century Cambodian writers
21st-century Cambodian writers
20th-century German writers
21st-century German writers